McGarry is an incorporated township in Timiskaming District in Northeastern Ontario, Canada. It includes the communities of Virginiatown, North Virginiatown, and Kearns. The township borders with Quebec to the east, along Highway 66 between Kirkland Lake and Rouyn-Noranda. The northern border of the township forms part of the border between Timiskaming District and Cochrane District. Highway 66 was rerouted in 2017 because of concerns that aging mine shafts under the road could cause it to collapse.

J.T. Kearns (after whom one of the communities was named) staked a claim in 1907, which became the Chesterville Gold Mines (1938–1952). An  shaft connected 20 levels, and its 500-ton stamp mill produced a total of 458,880 ounces of gold. Virginiatown and North Virginiatown were built to house the Kerr Addison workers. The Kerr-Addison Gold mine started in 1936, and employed 1,456 people by 1959. In 1960, the mine produced the most gold in the Western Hemisphere, and the 10 millionth ounce of gold was produced in 1982.

History

Gold in the area was originally reported in the late 1800s by Chief Ignace Tonené of the Temagami First Nation. He staked a claim near the north arm of Larder Lake but claimed it was stolen. He reported it, but Indian Affairs was unable to help. Chief Tonenè Lake was named in his honour.

On December 21, 1972, masked thieves successfully robbed the Virginiatown Canadian Imperial Bank of Commerce on the Kerr Addison miners' payday. The robbers were never captured.

In 2016, the nearby Tournene Lake (or Lac Tournene in French), was officially re-named as Chief Tonene Lake.

Beaverhouse First Nation 
In 2018, Beaverhouse First Nation submitted a claim to the Government of Ontario, asserting the community is a distinct First Nation and did not sign Treaty 9, or any other treaty.  On April 19, 2022, Beaverhouse First Nation was officially recognized as a First Nation under Section 35 of Canada’s Constitution.

Demographics 

Economy
McGarry's economy has historically been supported by the mining industry, and struggled when the mines were not producing.

The Armistice Gold mine was purchased by Bonterra Resources from Kerr Resources in 2016, and gold exploration and modelling was done to update the resource to a National Instrument 43-101 Compliant Resource.

Gold Candle Ltd. and investors purchased the historic Chesterville Gold Mines and Kerr Addison Gold Mines property in 2016, and conducted a feasibility study and gold exploration with Canadian Exploration Services Limited on the old Chesterville Gold Mines and Kerr Addison Gold Mines property.

Tourism

McGarry hosts several events, including an annual fish derby at Larder Lake, and a Labour Day weekend music event at the McGarry community centre. Gem Lake Maple Bedrock Provincial Park is located in McGarry Township. Sport fishing is permitted within Gem Lake Maple Bedrock Provincial Park. McGarry Township Forest Conservation Reserve, shared with McFadden Township, is located in McGarry Township.

See also
List of townships in Ontario
List of francophone communities in Ontario
Larder Lake, Ontario
Mount Cheminis (nearby inselberg)

References

External links

Municipalities in Timiskaming District
Single-tier municipalities in Ontario
Township municipalities in Ontario
History of mining in Canada